"The Ear of Corn" is a German fairy tale collected by the Brothers Grimm, number 194. It is Aarne-Thompson type 779, Divine Rewards and Punishments.

Synopsis
Corn (wheat) used to produce many more grains, but one day God saw a woman using the grain to clean off her muddy son.  Angry, he cursed them to have no more grain, since they were not worthy of it.  Bystanders pleaded with him to have mercy, especially because of the children, and he chose to have the current amount of grain.

Title
Different usages have led to this tale being called "The Ear of Corn" and "The Ear of Wheat" in English.

References

Grimms' Fairy Tales